"Banquet" is a song from British band Bloc Party's debut album Silent Alarm. Originally released on a double A-side single along with "Staying Fat" in May 2004 by Moshi Moshi Records, it was re-released as a regular single in the United Kingdom by Wichita Recordings on 25 April 2005. It was their first single to chart on the Billboard Modern Rock Tracks where it came in at number 34, and is often credited as their breakthrough single in North America. It was also featured in the song "Bloc Party" on the Fort Minor Mixtape: We Major. It was ranked  31 in NME's top 100 tracks of the decade, and was number 54 in Triple J's Hottest 100 of all time. It peaked at No. 13 on the UK Singles Chart.  In 2011, NME placed it at number 20 on its list "150 Best Tracks of the Past 15 Years". The song was featured in the 2018/19 video game Life Is Strange 2.

Background and music 
The song was originally written by Okereke on tour in 2003. Okereke was inspired by Pixies' record Doolittle at the time, specifically the song called "I Bleed", which was later used for the phrasing of "Banquet". Apart from Pixies, Okereke was also inspired by the song "Prince Charming" by Adam and the Ants.

The song is in the key of A♯ minor and in 4/4 time signature. One of the most notable parts of the song is the guitar interplay between Okereke and Lissack, which continues through much of the song.

Meaning
The song is about teenage life and contains lines and phrases related to sex.
The song also contains contradiction such as "turning away from the light" and "turning into the light". These and other phrases, such as, I'm on fire, reflect the author's feelings of the process of "becoming adult".

Music videos
There were two videos for "Banquet". A non-released version contains a recurring theme of hands with the hands pushing around band members Russell Lissack and Gordon Moakes while other hands cover up drummer Matt Tong's head and cast a shadow over frontman Kele Okereke. The hands eventually try to stab all of Bloc Party, set fire to the set and destroy the instruments and amps. Meanwhile, the released version shows the group performing in front of many different people. It is shown in full color and in black and white. The music video has gained around 32 million views on YouTube.

Remixes
The song has been remixed 10 times. Its remix by Phones (Paul Epworth) was released as a promotional single for their remix album Silent Alarm Remixed and their EP Bloc Party EP. The songs remix by The Streets had a music video made and was released as one of the b-sides for their single "Two More Years". Its two remixes by Boys Noize were released as a 10" single.

This is a list of all remixes of the song:

"Banquet (Phones Disco Edit)"
"Banquet (The Streets Mix)"
"Banquet (Another Version By The Glimmers)"
"Banquet (Boys Noize Vox Mix)"
"Banquet (Boys Noize Dub)"
"Bloc Party" (Remix of Banquet by Mike Shinoda, Apathy & Tak of S.O.B.)
"Banquet (Cornelius Remix)"
"Banquet (Black Moustache Remix)"
"Banquet (Fake ID's Feast Mix)"
"Banquet (Junior Sanchez JR Mix)"

Banquet (Phones Disco Edit)

"Banquet (Phones Disco Edit)" was a promotional single by Bloc Party from their first EP "Bloc Party EP", and their remix album "Silent Alarm Remixed". It was originally released as a one sided white label vinyl to promote the "Bloc Party EP", which was limited to 250 copies, but was re-released to promote "Silent Alarm Remixed" with the original version of "Banquet" on side B. This version is still available on the Wichita Recordings website. The remix appeared in the video game Midnight Club 3: DUB Edition Remix.

Track listings
Original 12-inch vinyl
 "Banquet (Phones Disco Edit)" - 5:25

Re-release 12-inch vinyl
 "Banquet (Phones Disco Edit)" - 5:25
 "Banquet" - 3:21

Digital download
 "Banquet (Phones Disco Edit)" - 5:25

Track listings
CD: Wichita / WEBB078SCD (UK)
 "Banquet"
 "Compliments" (Peel Session) [produced by Miti Adhikari]
 "Banquet" (Another Version by The Glimmers)

CD: Wichita / VVR5032983 (European release)
 "Banquet"
 "Banquet" (Another Version by The Glimmers)
 "Banquet" (EP Version)
 "Banquet" (Phones Disco Edit)
 "Banquet" (Cornelius Remix)
 "Banquet" (video)

DVD: Wichita / WEBB078DVD (UK)
 "Banquet"
 "So Here We Are" (Peel Session)
 "Banquet" (Video)
 "Little Thoughts" (Video)

7-inch: Wichita / WEBB078S (UK)
 "Banquet"
 "Tulips" (Peel Session)

Charts

Certifications

References

External links
 

2005 singles
2005 songs
Bloc Party songs
Song recordings produced by Paul Epworth
Songs written by Kele Okereke
Wichita Recordings singles
Songs written by Russell Lissack
Songs written by Gordon Moakes
Songs written by Matt Tong